Simin Liu is an American physician researcher. He holds leadership positions internationally in the research of nutrition, genetics, epidemiology, and environmental and biological influences of complex diseases related to cardiometabolic health in diverse population. His research team has uncovered new mechanisms and risk-factors as well as developed research frameworks for diabetes and cardiovascular diseases. Liu's laboratory conducts research mainly in the United States, though the group has had research collaborations, teaching, and service activities in six of the Seven Continents.

As of July 2021, Liu has over 143,426 citations and a h-index of 139 on Google Scholar.

Education 

He earned his medical degree from Jinan University in China in 1991. He then earned his M.S. in epidemiology from State University of New York at Albany in 1993. Liu went on to receive his master's degree in public health (MPH) and doctoral degrees (ScD) in both epidemiology and nutrition from Harvard University in 1998. Liu also completed a fellowship in public health and preventive medicine in the Epidemic Intelligence Service (EIS) program at the Centers for Disease Control and Prevention.

Career
Liu is currently a professor of epidemiology at Brown University School of Public Health and professor of medicine (endocrinology) at Brown University's Alpert Medical School, and director of the Center for Global Cardiometabolic Health (CGCH). He also holds an adjunct professorship at the Harvard T.H. Chan School of Public Health. Prior to joining the Brown faculty, Liu was the founding director of the UCLA Burroughs Wellcome Fund (BWF) Inter-school Program in Metabolic Diseases and the Center for Metabolic Disease Prevention.From 2005 to 2013, he served as professor of epidemiology, medicine, and OBGYN at UCLA. From 1998 to 2005, Liu served as instructor, assistant, and associate professor of medicine at Harvard Medical School and Brigham and Women's Hospital in Boston, and assistant and associate professor of epidemiology at the Harvard School of Public Health. He is currently an associate editor for The American Journal of Clinical Nutrition.

As of 2020 he is the Anandi L. Sharma Visiting Professor of Cardiovascular Medicine, at the Cardiovascular Institute of Mount Sinai Hospital and the Icahn School of Medicine at Mount Sinai, New York, NY.

Awards 
He has served on several national and international committees and advisory board for the NIH, the CDC, the Chinese CDC, the Canadian Institutes of Health Research and Canadian Foundation for Innovation, the British Medical Research Councils(MRC), and the World Health Organization (WHO) addressing policy issues in both medicine and public health. 
 
1993-1995 Fellow in Epidemiology, Epidemic Intelligence Service (EIS), Centers for Disease Control and Prevention (CDC)
In 1996 he was awarded the Arthur T. Lyman and Henry S. Grew Scholarship at Harvard University
2004 Elected Fellow, Council on Epidemiology and Prevention, American Heart
Association (FAHA)
 2012 Elected Member, American Epidemiological Society (AES)
 2012 Elected Member, American Society of Clinical Investigation (ASCI)
 2016 Awardee, Genomic and Precision Medicine Mentoring Award
 2019 Awardee, Fulbright Distinguished Chair in Global Health

References

Jinan University alumni
University at Albany, SUNY alumni
Brown University faculty
Harvard Medical School faculty
Harvard School of Public Health faculty
Year of birth missing (living people)
Living people
Harvard School of Public Health alumni